Oak Grove is an unincorporated community in Hardee County, Florida, United States.

Notes

Unincorporated communities in Hardee County, Florida
Unincorporated communities in Florida